Bukit Mertajam High School (abbreviated SMKTBM or HSBM; also known as High School Bukit Mertajam) is a secondary school located in Bukit Mertajam, Penang, Malaysia.

Name 
The name of the school has changed several times, from the Government English School Bukit Mertajam in early years, to Bukit Mertajam High School, and finally to High School Bukit Mertajam. The School, however is most commonly called "High School" by local people.

In Malay, BM High School is named Sekolah Tinggi Bukit Mertajam, and in 1997 was referred to as S.M.K.T.B.M. (Sekolah Menengah Kebangsaan Tinggi Bukit Mertajam).

In Mandarin, High School Bukit Mertajam is called Da Shan Jiao Ying Wen Zhong Xue, which translates to "Bukit Mertajam English Secondary School".

History

Early years 
Bukit Mertajam High School was the first government school in Province Wellesley. The school officially opened on January 18, 1927 with an enrollment of roughly 300 students. During the 1920s, students crossed the channel twice daily in order to attend school at Penang island to study beyond Standard 5. Among the schools in the island at that time were the Penang Free School and St. Xavier's Institution.

Harold Ambrose Robinson Cheeseman — then Inspector of Schools Penang, later Director of Education in Malaya— was very outset, Mr. Stowell sought to create a replica of the Sedbergh English Public School, which he had attended and which is known for its stringent discipline.

Cheeseman wrote the following on the occasion of the school's 21st anniversary:
I was almost heart-broken. The High School is an exact replica of the elementary school building of Rangoon Road in Singapore. I protested in vain...

The pioneer staff included the following people:

The main wooden block was constructed in 1926, directly facing the Bukit Mertajam Hill that stands sentinel over Bukit Mertajam. The school hall came into being in 1929.

Cutting and leveling out the slope in front of the school for a playing field went on for several years until Mr. C.E.H. Jacobs came into office in 1931. He persuaded the Public Works Department to plant capalogium over the surface, cut the creepers when they had grown to two or three feet high, and plough them back into the clay. The field was then left for months for the vegetation to rot and help break up as well as fertilize the soil. The operation took about a year, and now the ground was ready for grass to be planted. The field was titled "Jacob's Green" after C.E.H. Jacobs's particular care in the state of the field. Jacobs's Green Society came into being two years later with the object of improving and beautifying not only the field but also the grounds in general.

Second World War 

The following was written in captivity in Changi Prison, May 1942, by J.E. Tod, headmaster from 1947 to 1950:

Towards the end of 1941, the school was occupied by the Australian Army and the school was removed to the rice mill behind the Bukit Mertajam District Hospital. By December 13, the Japanese were bombing Penang. Every day the students could see ten or twenty Japanese Zero Japanese Zero plane flying over Bukit Mertajam on their mission to bomb Penang Island.

One bomb fell on the Bukit Mertajam railway station, causing an explosion. The students immediately went under their desk for cover. After half an hour, Rev. Colin King held an assembly and told the boys that the school was going to have a long holiday. The boys were very happy, not knowing that the holiday would last for more than three years and many of their class and school mates would be killed in World War II. In September 1945 the Japanese surrendered, the high school re-opened and registered the boys who wished to study again. Mr. Cheong Hong Oon was the acting Headmaster before Mr. D.K. Swan arrived in 1946, and he wrote the following of the events post-war:

All the boys who were keen to pick up the broken threads of their education again were enrolled, irrespective of their age. The High School spirit had revived and the school flourished again...

After the war 
On May 28, 1951, Penang Harbour Board presented Bukit Mertajam High School the School Bell. It was first rung by the Honourable, The Resident Commissioner, Mr. A. Caston who officially opened the Science Block.

On May 15, 1952, His Excellency the High Commissioner to Malaya, Sir Gerald Temper, visited High School accompanied by Mr. Aitken, the District Officer. The headmaster, Mr. F.H. Jones took him around the school.

In 1988, the school tradition was broken when girls were admitted into 4th Form (Senior 4) and later into other forms. The pupils in 4th Form were selected from various schools based on their results in the SRP ("Sijil Rendah Pelajaran"), an evolved version of Lower Certificate of Education, a Senior 3 public examination. However this new tradition breakout was not entirely new. The school had already accepted female students in smaller numbers into Sixth Forms at earlier dates.

Bukit Mertajam High School celebrated its Golden Jubilee in 1987.

On August 31, 1986, a tragedy occurred when the upper floor of Block B caught fire. The school library and four classrooms were burnt down. Old school magazines, reference books and other main documents were destroyed.

In 1992 Bukit Mertajam High School was awarded The Penang State Level Sekolah Harapan Negara. In 1997, High School emerged as one of the earliest school in the country to make it compulsory for students to wear ties and for Muslim Students to wear Baju Melayu. As a Premier School (Sekolah Perdana), Bukit Mertajam High School was a pioneer school in providing Information Technology subject for both the MGCE and MHCE.

Bukit Mertajam High School is also very reputable for its extra-curricular achievements. Some of the remarkable achievements are in Soccers, Rugby, Taekwondo (WTF) etc.

Year 2009 and beyond 
Recently, the High School was awarded Premier School status by the Education board. This caused the traditionally racial diverse school to become almost Bumiputera as it became an elite school for the Malays.

School identity

The assembly 

In the early days of the school, the morning assembly was held in the hall. As the Headmaster strode up the stairs, leading to the stage, where the teachers were seated in a semicircle, the Colour Captain (present House Captain) who was on duty would step onto the 'Castle'. The 'Castle' was a platform about one and half feet high and a yard square. It had four massive but beautifully carved legs, and a couple of steps led up to it. The 'Castle' was placed immediately in front of the stage on the cement floor. In his hand the Colour Captain held a wand about four or five feet high, painted with the colours of his House. The top of the wand ended in a knob on which was mounted a trophy with the Colour (House) had won. The trophy was usually in the form of a statuette. The Colour Captain then would lead the boys in reciting The Compass and in the singing of the Colour Song.

The value of this ceremony cannot be expressed more precisely than in the words of the first Headmaster, Mr. E. La M. Stowell, "As, in Malaya, the boys have so many religions, I think something, like the Compass or Statement, is the best kind of substitute we can give them for a good, shared, basic ethical purpose with which to start the day" Moreover, he says, "They lennd solemnity, and a little ceremony and formality to the opening of the School Day".

The school pledge and oath 
It is our bounden duty to uphold the Honour of the School at all times and in all places, both now as boys and girls and later as men and women and old boys and old girls. The Honour of the School will not be upheld by talking or writing. It is by his conduct that a man is judged: his deeds speaks louder than words, and in a little example persuadeth more than precept.

From the School more is to be learnt than the wisdom of books: the conduct of a good man and true may be learnt at school.

A good man and true scorns to succeed by means that are dishonest. He never gives in, he never admits defeat. After being punished or blamed, he does not sulk or complain. He never deserts his friends, his Colour or his School under any circumstances. Above all he will stand up for the king, the king who keeps his enemies beyond boundaries within which we live and without which, murder, oppression, famine and robbery would stalk through province. To him while we shelter beneath his flag, gratitude and goodness demand our outspoken loyalty.

The school motto 
The school motto is Aut Coepisse Noli Aut Confice in Latin which means "Accomplish or Do Not Begin".

The school crest 
In 1948 the school had its own crest. A competition was organised and Mr. Soon Eng Kong and old boys of the school presented a prize to the winning entry, which was a design submitted by Mr. Oh Boon Tat.

The design has the outline of the Bukit, by the side of which appear grains of padi to indicate the dominant agricultural activity of the local environment. On the scroll is inscribed the High School motto, Aut Coepisse Noli Aut Confice.

The school colours 
The school was divided into four houses named Red, Green, Blue and Yellow, each having their respective leader. Each colour would be run by a nominated council, which would look into all cases of breach of outdoor discipline and administer suitable punishment. In the early days, there were only four sport houses; Red House, Yellow House, Blue House, and Green House.

Red House was renamed Cheeseman House, as an honour to H.R. Cheeseman, the man behind the establishment of the school.

Yellow House was renamed Stowell House, as an honor to Mr. E. de La M. Stowell, the first headmaster of the school.

Blue House was renamed Colin King House, as an honour to Rev. Colin King, the headmaster during the World War II.

The Green House was renamed Soon Eng Kong House, as an honour to Mr. Soon Eng Kong, a donor who contributed to the school scholarship - the Soon Eng Kong Gold Medal.

In the 1990s a new house was added - Tun Salleh House with Orange colour. It was named after Tun Mohd. Salleh b. Ismail, an old boy of the school who was the first Inspector General of Police of Singapore and Malaya.

School song

The Compass

Notable alumni 

Abdullah Ahmad Badawi, 5th Prime Minister of Malaysia
Tun Mohd. Salleh b. Ismail 1st Inspector General of Police of Singapore and Malaya
Mr Ng Kim Siong
1st Inspector General of Police (IGP) Singapore
Tan Sri Prof Emeritus Chin Fung Kee
Queens Scholar & Former (Acting) VC of University Malaya
YB Tan Sri Dato Hj Lamin bin Hj Mohd Yunus
President of Appeals Court, Malaysia
Tan Sri Ahmad Kamil Jaffar
Ketua Setiausaha (KSU), Ministry of Foreign Affairs Malaysia
Dato L. Krishnan Pioneer of Malaysian Film Industry
Mr Goh Hock Guan
Architect & Town Planner behind Subang Jaya township & restructuring town planning in Vietnam
YBhg Dato' Dr Ibrahim Saad
Former Minister of Transport, Malaysia
Prof Ishak Thamby Chik
Former Vice Chancellor of Universiti Sains Malaysia (USM)
Tan Sri Mohd Radzi Mansor Chairman of Telekom (M) Berhad
YBhg Dato Seri Hj Mohd Shariff bin Hj Omar
Deputy Minister Agriculture Ministry
Dato Jegathesan Former Secretary General, Ministry of Housing Malaysia
Gen (Rtd) Abdullah Shamsudin
General, Malaysian Army
Gen (Rtd) Mohamad Shah Yahaya
General, Malaysian Army
Steven Sim 

Deputy Minister of Youth and Sports

References

External links 
 Alumni homepage
 Official homepage
 HSBM Blog
 HSBM Forum

Bukit Mertajam
Secondary schools in Malaysia
Educational institutions established in 1927
1927 establishments in British Malaya
Publicly funded schools in Malaysia
Schools in Penang